Deon Juniel Figures (born January 10, 1970) is a former American college and professional football player who was cornerback in the National Football League (NFL) for six seasons.  He played college football for the University of Colorado, and earned All-American honors.  A first-round pick in the 1993 NFL Draft, he played professionally for the Pittsburgh Steelers and Jacksonville Jaguars of the NFL.

Early years
Figures was born in Bellflower, California. He grew up playing Pop Warner football in Gardena, under coach Chris Mahoney. He graduated from Junípero Serra High School, where he played for the Serra Cavaliers high school football team.

College career
Figures attended the University of Colorado at Boulder, and played for the Colorado Buffaloes football team from 1988 to 1992.  As a freshman in 1988, he played in 10 games and intercepted two passes against the Iowa State Cyclones, setting a record for Buffalo freshmen. He did not qualify academically in 1989, but played in all 12 games and compiled 67 unassisted tackles and 18 assists as a redshirt sophomore in 1990.  In a non-conference game against the No. 12 Washington Huskies, Figures intercepted a second pass from Huskies quarterback Mark Brunell in the final minute of the game to secure the victory.  After winning the Big Eight Conference championship with a 7–0 conference schedule and compiling a 10–1–1 overall record, the Buffaloes faced the No. 5 Notre Dame Fighting Irish in the Orange Bowl.  Memorably, Figures intercepted a pass from Irish quarterback Rick Mirer as time expired to ice the Buffaloes' 10–9 victory and win the 1990 national championship.

By the start of his 1991 junior season, opposing Big Eight coaches were well aware of Figures' defensive skills and sought to direct offensive plays away from him, but nevertheless compiled two interceptions and 39 tackles, and helped the Buffaloes win a share of their third straight Big Eight championship and another top-25 ranking.  As a senior in 1992, he had six more interceptions while logging 38 tackles, and was recognized as a consensus first-team All-American.  He was also the recipient of the Jim Thorpe Award and Jack Tatum Trophy as the best college defensive back in the country.

Professional career
As a member of the Steelers, he helped his team reach the AFC Championship Game against the San Diego Chargers in 1994. In his six seasons in the NFL, Figures played in 93 games, started 40 of them, and recorded 269 tackles, nine interceptions and four recovered fumbles.

NFL statistics

References

1970 births
Living people
All-American college football players
American football cornerbacks
Colorado Buffaloes football players
Jacksonville Jaguars players
Sportspeople from Los Angeles County, California
Pittsburgh Steelers players
Players of American football from California
Junípero Serra High School (Gardena, California) alumni